Colin Welford (born 1967 in Manchester, England) is an English composer for stage and screen, conductor, orchestrator and music director based in the United States. 
 
He holds a Master's degree in Music from Oxford University, England (Organ Scholar, Brasenose College), and pursued graduate study at The Royal College of Music, London (orchestral conducting, composition), University of Miami (orchestral conducting, composition) and at Columbia College Chicago (Master's program in film composition).

In 1991 he was invited by John de Lancie (oboist), former principal oboist of the Philadelphia Orchestra, to join the faculty at the recently formed New World School of the Arts in Miami (Florida), and there he led the Orchestral Department and taught orchestration for the following three years. During this time Welford also taught at the University of Florida and Florida International University where he was a professor in orchestration and composition.

After touring the US as Associate Conductor of the 1st National Tours of The Will Rogers Follies (Dir. Tommy Tune), and  The Who's Tommy (Dir. Des McAnuff), he was hired by Pete Townshend of the legendary UK rock band The Who as Music Director/Conductor (and later, Music Supervisor) of the Broadway-originated musical The Who's Tommy in the UK and Europe.

As a freelance Opera and Ballet conductor he has performed widely in Europe and the United States, and as conductor at English National Ballet he led premieres of Swan Lake, The Nutcracker, Coppelia, Romeo and Juliet (Prokofiev), Giselle, Alice in Wonderland (Tchaikovsky) and Les Sylphides, amongst others.

He was Music Director for the original 1997 stage production of The Fix (Dir. Sam Mendes) at the Donmar Warehouse, London.

Between 2000 and 2005 Welford was Music Supervisor and Assistant Music Producer of Disney's The Lion King on Broadway (Dir. Julie Taymor) and for eleven subsequent new productions worldwide, during which time he conducted original cast albums in Germany, the Netherlands and Spain that since achieved platinum sales status. For his work on the Los Angeles production of The Lion King (2000-2003) he also won an NAACP award nomination for Outstanding Service to People of Color.

He has arranged extensively for orchestra and choral ensembles, The New York Pops orchestra amongst others, and scores independent film and animation. He is the orchestrator, conductor and/or arranger of several award-winning solo vocal and orchestral albums.

He was Music Director of the award-winning Chicago production of the Broadway musical Wicked (2005–2009) (Music by Stephen Schwartz, Dir. Joe Mantello).

He conducted the award-winning musical Billy Elliot (Music by Sir Elton John, Dir. Stephen Daldry) on Broadway (New York) in 2009, and subsequently was Conductor and Music Director for new productions of Billy Elliot in Chicago and Toronto, The Netherlands, Korea, Japan and several regional productions in the North America (2009–2018)

References

Living people
English conductors (music)
British male conductors (music)
British music educators
Alumni of Brasenose College, Oxford
Alumni of the Royal College of Music
University of Miami Frost School of Music alumni
University of Florida faculty
1967 births
21st-century British conductors (music)
21st-century British male musicians